Le Jules Verne is a restaurant located on the second floor of the Eiffel Tower in the 7th arrondissement of Paris, France.

History 
Since 2019, Le Jule Verne'''s cuisine has been led by chef Frédéric Anton, who succeeded Louis Grondard (1983), Alain Reix (1992) and Alain Ducasse (2007). All these chefs were awarded a Michelin Guide star in the restaurant.

Louis Vaudable, who used to be the owner of Le Jules Verne, now owns Maxim's in the 8th arrondissement.

The interior was designed by Aline Asmar d'Amman.

On July 13, 2017, Le Jules Vernes'' received the French and American presidential couples (Brigitte and Emmanuel Macron; Melania and Donald Trump) for a dinner.

After restoration works that lasted several months, the restaurant was reopened on July 20, 2019.

References

External links 

 Official website 

Restaurants in Paris
French restaurants in France
Buildings and structures in the 7th arrondissement of Paris
Eiffel Tower